"Itsy Bitsy Teenie Weenie Yellow Polka Dot Bikini" is a novelty song telling the story of a shy girl wearing a revealing polka dot bikini at the beach. It was written by Paul Vance and Lee Pockriss and first released in June 1960 by Brian Hyland, with an orchestra conducted by John Dixon. The Hyland version reached number one on the Billboard Hot 100, selling a million copies in the US, and was a worldwide hit. The song has been adapted into French as "Itsy bitsy petit bikini" and into German as "Itsy Bitsy Teenie Weenie Honolulu-Strand-Bikini", reaching number one on national charts in both languages. Several versions of the song have proved successful in various European countries. In 1990 a version by British pop band Bombalurina, titled "Itsy Bitsy Teeny Weeny Yellow Polka Dot Bikini", reached number one on the UK Singles Chart and in Ireland.

History and lyric
The story told through the three verses of the song is as follows: (1) the young lady is too afraid to leave the locker where she has changed into her bikini; (2) she has made it to the beach but sits on the sand wrapped in a blanket; (3) she has finally gone into the ocean, but is too afraid to come out, and stays immersed in the water – despite the fact she's "turning blue" – to hide herself from view.

Trudy Packer recited the phrases "...two, three, four / Tell the people what she wore", heard at the end of each verse before the chorus; and "Stick around, we'll tell you more", heard after the first chorus and before the start of the second verse.

In an interview and article by Greg Ehrbar in The Cartoon Music Book, edited by Daniel Goldmark and Yuval Taylor, Rankin-Bass musical director Maury Laws said he 'ghosted' the arrangement of the song for John Dixon, as Dixon had taken on more work than he could handle at that time.

At a time when bikini bathing suits were still seen as too risqué to be mainstream, the song prompted a sudden takeoff in bikini sales. It is credited as being one of the earliest contributors to the acceptance of the bikini in society. The early 1960s saw a slew of surf movies and other film and television productions that rapidly built on the song's momentum.

Hyland's version hit number one on the Billboard Hot 100 on August 8, 1960, and sold over a million copies in the US. It also made the top 10 in other countries, including #8 on the UK Singles Chart.  It also reached #1 in New Zealand.

Ownership controversy
In September 2006, Paul Vance, the song's co-writer, saw his own mistaken obituary on TV, as a consequence of the death of another man, Paul Van Valkenburgh, who claimed to have written "Itsy Bitsy Teenie Weenie Yellow Polkadot Bikini" under the name Paul Vance. The impostor had explained his lack of royalty payments for the song by claiming that he had sold the rights as a teenager. Vance, the song's true co-author, earned several million dollars from the song from 1960 until his own death in 2022, describing it as "a money machine."

In other media

The song was featured in the 1961 Billy Wilder film comedy One, Two, Three – in a key scene, the character Otto (Horst Buchholz), suspected of being a spy, is being tortured by the East German police playing the song to him repetitively, eventually with the record off-center to create a weird howling variation of pitch. The actual recording was re-released in 1962 to capitalize on the film's success, but it did not rechart.

The song is also used in the films Aparna Sen film 36 Chowringhee Lane (1981), Sister Act 2 and Revenge of the Nerds II: Nerds in Paradise.

It was going to be one of the tracks for Just Dance 2017, but was removed for an unknown reason. However, it has made an appearance in its sequel Just Dance 2018, performed by The Sunlight Shakers.

Charts

Weekly charts

Year-end charts

Italian versions 

The song was adapted into Italian under the title "Pezzettini di Bikini" by Giancarlo Testoni and recorded by Dalida  in 1960. Then was recorded by Marino Marini

French versions 

The song was adapted into French under the title "Itsy bitsy petit bikini" by André Salvet and Lucien Morisse. The French version was recorded in 1960 first by Dalida and then by Johnny Hallyday and Richard Anthony. Sales of all three French versions, as well as Brian Hyland's English version, were combined and reached number one in Wallonia (French-speaking Belgium), charting for nine months from September 1, 1960, to May 1, 1961.

A version by the animated character Funny Bear also reached the top 30 in France in 2007.

Richard Anthony's version of "Itsy bitsy petit bikini" appears in the 2006 film A Good Year.

Track listings 
Dalida version
7-inch single Barclay 70345 (1960)
 "Itsi bitsi petit bikini" (2:13)
 "O sole mio" (2:51)

Johnny Hallyday version
7-inch single Vogue V. 45-775 (1960)
 "Itsy bitsy petit bikini" (2:15)
 "Depuis qu'ma môme" (2:25

Charts

Johnny Hallyday version

Funny Bear version

German versions
In Germany, the song was renamed "Itsy Bitsy Teenie Weenie Honolulu-Strand-Bikini" and with German lyrics written by Rudolf Günter Loose. It was recorded by Club Honolulu, an alias for French-born Italian singer Caterina Valente and her brother Silvio Francesco, and reached number one on the West German charts.

The teenage Danish brothers Jan & Kjeld also recorded a version in German, but although the duo were popular in West Germany, having already had several hits there, their version failed to chart in that country, and its only chart appearance was in the Netherlands.

Charts

Club Honolulu version

Jan & Kjeld version

Albert West versions
Dutch singer Albert West collaborated with original singer Hyland on an updated version in 1988, which reached number 43 on the Dutch singles chart. In 2003 West recorded another version of the song with Band Zonder Banaan which reached number 36.

Charts

Albert West & Brian Hyland version

Band Zonder Banaan & Albert West version

Bombalurina version

In July 1990, a version was released by Bombalurina, titled "Itsy Bitsy Teeny Weeny Yellow Polka Dot Bikini", which featured Timmy Mallett, star of Wacaday, a popular UK children's television show of the time, along with two dancers, Dawn Andrews and Annie Dunkley. Andrews later married Gary Barlow of the group Take That. Mallett told the British pop magazine Smash Hits that the composer of popular theatre musicals Andrew Lloyd Webber had come up with the idea for making the single, and had asked Mallett to sing on it. The day after recording the song, Mallett took a copy of it on a tour of European clubs where he was making personal appearances, and asked the clubs' DJs to play the song, raising public awareness of the record. In November 2008, schoolteacher and former singer Everton Barnes claimed that he was the real singer on the record, as Mallett had been unable to hit the right notes and sang flat.

The song was released on Carpet Records, a subsidiary of Andrew Lloyd Webber's Really Useful Group. Lloyd Webber later admitted that he had produced the song because his wife had bet him that as a composer of musical theatre, he would not be able to make a pop song that was a big hit. The band name "Bombalurina" was taken from the name of one of the characters in Lloyd Webber's musical Cats.

The song reached number one on the UK Singles Chart on August 19, 1990, and was certified silver for sales of 200,000 copies. The single also reached number one in Ireland and the top ten in Austria, Finland, Germany, New Zealand, and Norway.

Charts

Weekly charts

Year-end charts

Certifications

Other cover versions and parodies
There have been cover versions in many languages.
 Teenage singer Jeri Lynne Fraser released "Poor Begonia (Caught Pneumonia)" in 1960 as an answer to what happened next.  
 Comedian Buddy Hackett released a cover version of this song soon after the original was released.
 German version with Club Honolulu (Caterina Valente and her brother Silvio Francesco) in 1960.
 The country comedy duo Homer and Jethro did a parody version on their 1966 album "Songs To Tickle Your Funny Bone".
 Connie Francis included a version of the song on her 1966 album Connie Francis and The Kids Next Door.
 Jimi Hendrix played a brief cover of the song on the live recording Mr. Pitiful, released in 1981 in Germany only.
 German punk band Die Toten Hosen covered the Club Honolulu version (in German) on their 1987 cover album Never Mind the Hosen, Here's Die Roten Rosen. It was released as a promo single under the alias Die Roten Rosen. Also, on the 2007 re-release, the English version was added as a bonus track.
 Hungarian pop star Szandi covered the song as the title track of her 1989 album  (English translation: Little Girl). The chorus in Hungarian is the following: , meaning "A teenie-weenie, itsy-bitsy, super-dooper Honolulu swimming suit".
 A cover version was made by Devo on the CD Pioneers Who Got Scalped. This version of the song had appeared in the film Revenge of the Nerds II: Nerds in Paradise, but was unavailable on CD until the release of the Pioneers album.
 Kermit the Frog and Miss Piggy covered the song for the 1993 album Muppet Beach Party.
 Ray Stevens, in 2012, covered the song on his 9-CD Encyclopedia of Recorded Comedy Music project.
 Mud recorded a cover version in 1982.
 A Brazil version, a little faithful to the original, (LP Ronnie Cord, Copacabana CLP 11.164, October 1960) was a hit in 1960 when it was sung by Ronnie Cord, and had some re-recordings, by artists like Celly Campello and Blitz's 1983 version.
 A Spanish version "Bikini Amarillo" (very faithful to the original) was an enormous hit for Mexican singer Manolo Muñoz in the 1960s.
 A Finnish version "Pikku pikku bikinissä" was sung by Pirkko Mannola in 1961.
 A Danish version "En mægtig smart men meget sart bikini" was sung by Dirch Passer and Lily Broberg in 1960.
 A Serbian version "Bikini sa žutim tačkicama" was sung by Ljiljana Petrović in 1962.
 In 1983, the British group Echo & the Bunnymen composed and recorded the song "Do It Clean", released on Porcupine album, which lyric lines were inspired by the Hyland's hit: "Iszy bitzy witzy itzy everywhere / I've been here and I've been there".
 In 1984, Dutch singer John Spencer made a Dutch version called 'Itsy Bitsy Teenie Weenie Rood Wit Blauwe Monokini' (meaning 'Itsy Bitsy Teenie Weenie Red White and Blue Monokini') 
 George Wright covered the song in his 1984 album Red Hot and Blue.
 In 1987, it was sung in Greek by Polina, with the title  (English: "The Pink Bikini"), in her album .
 Argentinian pop groups Viuda e hijas de Roque Enroll and The Sacados recorded successful versions in 1984 and 1990 respectively, under the name . The lyrics were translated into local slang, and update the source of shame to lack of waxing.
 A Bulgarian version  ("Tulip Themed Bathing Suit") sung by the children group Sparrows contains kids-friendly comic lyrics. In the lyrics, a girl falls in love with a boy impressed by his tulip themed swimming suit among other things.
 In Croatian, there is a cover by the group Trio Tividi, titled simply "Bikini".
 With lyrics in Swedish by Karl-Lennart, Lill-Babs recorded the song.
 At the beginning of 2006, a parody of the song was used for a TV Easy magazine advert, "I need an Itsy Bitsy Teenie Weenie TV Easy Magaziney".
 Günther recorded a version, "Teeny Weeny String Bikini".
 The singing character Gummibär recorded original English, Spanish and French versions.
 A snippet is the last song covered on the 12" version of the "Stars on 45 Medley".
 In 1960, it was sung in Japanese by Danny Iida & The Paradise King with Kyu Sakamoto as a member. (Toshiba Records JP-5051)
In 2021, the German pirate folk metal band, Storm Seeker, covered "Itsy Bitsy Teenie Weenie Honolulu Strand-Bikini" in German on their second studio album.
Swedish-American group The Mamas released a cover version in 2021 with new arrangement and some changes in the lyrics.

See also
List of Hot 100 number-one singles of 1960 (U.S.)
List of Billboard Hot 100 top-ten singles in 1960
List of Billboard Hot 100 number-one singles from 1958 to 1969
Billboard Year-End Hot 100 singles of 1960
List of Cash Box Top 100 number-one singles of 1960
List of number-one hits of 1960 (Germany)
List of number-one singles of 1960 (Canada)
List of number-one singles of 1960 (France)
List of number-one singles of 1961 (France)
List of number-one singles from the 1990s (UK)
List of UK top-ten singles in 1990
List of UK Singles Chart number ones of the 1990s
List of UK top-ten singles in 1990
List of number-one singles of 1990 (Ireland)

References

1959 singles
1960 singles
1990 debut singles
Brian Hyland songs
Johnny Hallyday songs
Caterina Valente songs
Billboard Hot 100 number-one singles
Cashbox number-one singles
Number-one singles in Canada
Number-one singles in Germany
Number-one singles in New Zealand
Number-one singles in South Africa
UK Singles Chart number-one singles
Irish Singles Chart number-one singles
Songs written by Lee Pockriss
Songs written by Paul Vance
Lill-Babs songs
Song recordings produced by Nigel Wright (record producer)
Song recordings produced by Andrew Lloyd Webber
1956 songs
Novelty songs
Bikinis
Barclay (record label) singles
Polydor Records singles
Virgin Records singles
Philips Records singles